Morgan Point is a cape in Chambers County, Texas.

References 

Geography of Chambers County, Texas